Walkies can refer to:

 Dog walking
 Walkie-talkie